Maria Perrotta is an Italian classical pianist and a Decca Records artist.

Life and career 
Born in Cosenza in 1974, Maria Perrotta made her debut with a symphony orchestra at the age of 11, performing Beethoven's Piano Concerto No. 1, but she came to the limelight in 2012, after performing J.S. Bach's Goldberg Variations during her ninth month of pregnancy. An ambulance was stationed outside the theatre in case the artist went into labour during the recital. Very few women in history had given a concert this far into their pregnancy; one of them being Clara Schumann. 
The live performance, published on CD by Decca, received rave reviews: "A perfect blend of the lush pianism of Alexis Weissenberg and the laser-like focus of Glenn Gould".

In 2013 Decca released a CD of Beethoven's Piano Sonatas Opp. 109, 110 and 111 played live by Maria Perrotta. The recording was acclaimed in leading musical magazines, including Gramophone, and in major newspapers: "Where Pollini is fast and formalistic, Perrotta is analytical and expressive, but, like Pollini, always maintains a sense of formal unity.".

A graduate of the Milan Conservatoire, the École Normale de Musique in Paris and the National Academy of St Cecilia in Rome, she has won top prizes in several international competitions, including the Shura Cherkassky International Piano Competition in Milan and the triennial International J.S. Bach Piano Competition in Germany. She has broadcast on Sky TV and on German and Italian radio.

Maria Perrotta is married to the Italian baritone Lucio Prete, with whom she has two daughters. They live in Paris.

Discography
 J.S. Bach: Goldberg Variations – 2014 Decca
 Beethoven: Piano Sonatas Nos. 30, 31, 32 – 2013 Decca
 Chopin: Maria Perrotta plays Chopin (Live, 2014) – 2015 Decca
 Schubert: Sonatas D784 & 960 – Grazer Fantasy D605A – 2017 Decca

References

External links
 http://mariaperrotta.eu

1974 births
Living people
Italian classical pianists
Italian women pianists
People from Calabria
People from Cosenza
Decca Records artists
Milan Conservatory alumni
Accademia Nazionale di Santa Cecilia alumni
21st-century classical pianists
Women classical pianists
21st-century women pianists